Thames is a former New Zealand electorate, in the Thames-Coromandel District. It existed from 1871 to 1946.

Geography
The electorate is based on the town of Thames. At times, it covered the Coromandel Peninsula.

History
The electorate existed from 1871 to 1946. At times, it was a multi-member electorate. It was represented by ten Members of Parliament.

Charles O'Neill was the first representative, elected in the 1871 general election. He represented the electorate until the end of the term in December 1875.

Thames was then converted into a two-member electorate. George Grey stood for both the City of Auckland West and the Thames electorates in the 1875 general election. In the two-member Auckland electorate, only Grey and Patrick Dignan were put forward as candidates, and were thus declared elected on 22 December 1875. The Thames electorate was contested by six candidates, including Julius Vogel (who was Premier in 1875), William Rowe and Charles Featherstone Mitchell. On election day (6 January 1876), Grey attracted the highest number of votes and unexpectedly, Rowe beat Vogel to second place (Vogel also stood in a second electorate – Wanganui, where he was returned). Hence Grey and Rowe were declared elected for Thames. A protest against Grey's election was lodged with the returning officer the following day, stating that Grey had not been eligible to stand for election in Thames, as he had already been elected in Auckland West. This petition was filed to the House of Representatives at the end of January.

With this controversy going on for several months, but being unresolved, Grey advised in mid June 1876 in a series of telegrams that he had chosen to represent Auckland West. On 8 July, the report of the committee inquiring into Sir George Grey's election for the Thames was read to the House. It was found that his election to the Thames electorate was in accordance with the law, but that he had to make a decision which electorate he would represent. On 15 July 1876, Grey announced that he would represent Thames, and he moved that a by-election be held in Auckland West for the seat that he would vacate there.

Rowe retired at the end of the term. The 1879 general election was contested by John Sheehan and George Grey, and they were thus declared elected unopposed.

In 1881, the electorate reverted to be represented by only one member. In the 1881 general election, Grey successfully contested Auckland East. Sheehan was confirmed as the representative for Thames.

In the 1884 general election, Sheehan (unsuccessfully) contested Napier. William Fraser was elected for Thames. Fraser was confirmed again in the 1887 general election.

Edmund Taylor and Alfred Cadman contested the Thames electorate in the 1890 general election. Cadman was successful with a 104 votes majority. He resigned his seat on 11 July 1893.

The resulting 31 July 1893 by-election was unanimously won by James McGowan, and he represented the electorate for many years until his resignation on 6 January 1909, as he was appointed to the Legislative Council.

Taylor, who was unsuccessful in 1890 against Cadman, won the resulting 4 February 1909 by-election. The second ballot electoral system was in place at the time, and required for this by-election. He held the electorate until the end of the parliamentary term in 1911.

Thomas William Rhodes defeated Taylor in the 1911 general election. Rhodes represented the electorate until his retirement in 1928.

In 1919 Mrs Aileen Cooke in Thames was one of three women who stood at short notice when women were able to stand as candidates for election to parliament.

Albert Samuel was first elected in the 1928 general election. He was re-elected in 1931 and retired in 1935.

Jim Thorn was the last representative of Thames. He was first elected in the 1935 general election. His parliamentary career finished in 1946. In the following year, he became High Commissioner to Canada. The Thames electorate was abolished in 1946.

Members of Parliament
Thames was represented by ten Members of Parliament.

Key

single-member electorate (1st time)
From 1871 to 1875, Thames was represented by one Member of Parliament.

multi-member electorate
From 1876 to 1881, Thames was a two-member electorate. It was represented by three Members of Parliament:

single-member electorate (2nd time)
From 1881 to 1946, Thames was a single member electorate again. Sheehan continued his representation, and six other members followed him:

Election results

1943 election

1938 election

1935 election

1931 election

1928 election

1909 by-election

1899 election

1896 election

1890 election

1876 election

References

Bibliography

Historical electorates of New Zealand
Thames-Coromandel District
1870 establishments in New Zealand
1946 disestablishments in New Zealand
Politics of Waikato